Monerolechia is a genus of lichenized fungi in the family Caliciaceae.

Species
Monerolechia bayrhofferi 
Monerolechia californica 
Monerolechia glomerulans 
Monerolechia norstictica 
Monerolechia papuensis

References

Caliciales
Lichen genera
Caliciales genera
Taxa described in 1857
Taxa named by Vittore Benedetto Antonio Trevisan de Saint-Léon